Dhabba Oil Terminal is a key Yemeni oil port. It lies western of Ash-Shihr town in Yemen's eastern Hadramawt on the Arabian Sea. The Dhabba Oil Terminal is mainly used to export oil and gas from Hadramawt governorate.

October 2022 attack 
On 21 October 2022 the terminal was targeted with drones for the first time by Yemen's rebel Houthi movement. The Yemeni government said it intercepted Houthi armed drones launched against al-Dhabba oil terminal when a Greek-owned oil tanker "Nissos" was preparing to dock to load 2 million barrels of crude from the terminal. There was no damage to the port and the tanker, but the Greek company said the attack targeted a Marshall Islands-flagged tanker, the Nissos Kea.

See also 

 Port of Shihr
 Hudaydah Port
 Port of Aden

References 

Oil terminals
Transport in Yemen
Hadhramaut Governorate
Ports and harbours of Yemen